Elections to Ballymena Borough Council were held on 15 May 1985 on the same day as the other Northern Irish local government elections. The election used four district electoral areas to elect a total of 23 councillors.

Election results

Note: "Votes" are the first preference votes.

Districts summary

|- class="unsortable" align="centre"
!rowspan=2 align="left"|Ward
! % 
!Cllrs
! % 
!Cllrs
! %
!Cllrs
! %
!Cllrs
!rowspan=2|TotalCllrs
|- class="unsortable" align="center"
!colspan=2 bgcolor="" | DUP
!colspan=2 bgcolor="" | UUP
!colspan=2 bgcolor="" | SDLP
!colspan=2 bgcolor="white"| Others
|-
|align="left"|Ballymena Town
|bgcolor="#D46A4C"|37.7
|bgcolor="#D46A4C"|3
|22.8
|2
|21.0
|1
|18.5
|1
|7
|-
|align="left"|Braid Valley
|bgcolor="#D46A4C"|48.5
|bgcolor="#D46A4C"|3
|35.3
|2
|0.0
|0
|16.2
|0
|5
|-
|align="left"|Kells Water
|bgcolor="#D46A4C"|73.6
|bgcolor="#D46A4C"|5
|26.4
|1
|0.0
|0
|0.0
|0
|6
|-
|align="left"|The Main
|bgcolor="#D46A4C"|68.8
|bgcolor="#D46A4C"|4
|31.2
|1
|0.0
|0
|0.0
|0
|5
|-
|- class="unsortable" class="sortbottom" style="background:#C9C9C9"
|align="left"| Total
|55.6
|15
|28.6
|6
|6.3
|1
|9.5
|2
|23
|-
|}

District results

Ballymena Town

1985: 3 x DUP, 2 x UUP, 1 x SDLP, 1 x Independent Unionist

Braid Valley

1985: 3 x DUP, 2 x UUP

Kells Water

1985: 5 x DUP, 1 x UUP

The Main

1985: 4 x DUP, 1 x UUP

References

Ballymena Borough Council elections
Ballymena